Orontes may refer to:

 Orontes River, in Lebanon, Syria, and Turkey
 Orontes, a mythological Indian leader whom the river is supposedly named after, as told in book 17 of the Greek epic poem Dionysiaca
 Orontes, a character mentioned in The Aeneid who is killed when his ship is swallowed by a whirlpool
 various members of the Armenian Orontid Dynasty (their name, also rendered as Orontas, Orondes, Aroandes, is the Hellenized form of an Iranian masculine name: Avestan: auruuant sometimes shortened to auruuat, Persian arvand, meaning "Of greatness, mighty"):
 Orontes I Sakavakyats
 Orontes I or Yervand I
 Orontes II or Yervand II
 Orontes III or Yervand III
 Orontes IV or yervand IV
 Rawadid dynasty, or Rawands, Kurdish dynasty in Azerbaijan (northwestern Iran)
 Rawandiz, a city in Iraq whose name is derived from a name which was spelled "Orontes" in Hellenic sources
 SS Orontes, a passenger ship of the Orient Line
 HMS Orontes, several ships of the Royal Navy

See also
 Yervand

Characters in Book VI of the Aeneid